The International Hydrographic Organization (IHO) is an intergovernmental organisation representing hydrography. , the IHO comprised 98 Member States.

A principal aim of the IHO is to ensure that the world's seas, oceans and navigable waters are properly surveyed and charted. It does this through the setting of international standards, the co-ordination of the endeavours of the world's national hydrographic offices, and through its capacity building program.
 
The IHO enjoys observer status at the United Nations, where it is the recognised competent authority on hydrographic surveying and nautical charting. When referring to hydrography and nautical charting in Conventions and similar Instruments, it is the IHO standards and specifications that are normally used.

History 
The IHO was established in 1921 as the International Hydrographic Bureau (IHB). The present name was adopted in 1970, as part of a new international Convention on the IHO adopted by the then member nations. The former name International Hydrographic Bureau was retained to describe the IHO secretariat until 8 November 2016, when a significant revision to the Convention on the IHO entered into force. Thereafter the IHB became known as the "IHO Secretariat", comprising an elected Secretary-General and two supporting Directors, together with a small permanent staff (18 in 2020), at the Organization's headquarters in Monaco.

During the 19th century, many maritime nations established hydrographic offices to provide means for improving the navigation of naval and merchant vessels by providing nautical publications, nautical charts, and other navigational services. There were substantial differences in hydrographic procedures charts, and publications. In 1889, an International Maritime Conference was held at Washington, D.C., and it was proposed to establish a "permanent international commission." Similar proposals were made at the sessions of the International Congress of Navigation held at Saint Petersburg in 1908 and the International Maritime Conference held at Saint Petersburg in 1912.

In 1919, the national Hydrographers of Great Britain and France cooperated in taking the necessary steps to convene an international conference of Hydrographers. London was selected as the most suitable place for this conference, and on 24 July 1919, the First International Conference opened, attended by the Hydrographers of 24 nations. The object of the conference was "To consider the advisability of all maritime nations adopting similar methods in preparation, construction, and production of their charts and all hydrographic publications; of rendering the results in the most convenient form to enable them to be readily used; of instituting a prompt system of mutual exchange of hydrographic information between all countries; and of providing an opportunity to consultations and discussions to be carried out on hydrographic subjects generally by the hydrographic experts of the world." This is still the major purpose of the IHO.

As a result of the 1919 Conference, a permanent organization was formed and statutes for its operations were prepared. The IHB, now the IHO, began its activities in 1921 with 18 nations as members. The Principality of Monaco was selected as the seat of the Organization as a result of the offer of Albert I of Monaco to provide suitable accommodation for the Bureau in the Principality.

Functions 
The IHO develops hydrographic and nautical charting standards. These standards are subsequently adopted and used by its member countries and others in their surveys, nautical charts, and publications. The almost universal use of the IHO standards means that the products and services provided by the world's national hydrographic and oceanographic offices are consistent and recognizable by all seafarers and for other users. Much has been done in the field of standardization since the IHO was founded.

The IHO has encouraged the formation of Regional Hydrographic Commissions (RHCs). Each RHC coordinates the national surveying and charting activities of countries within each region and acts as a forum to address other matters of common hydrographic interest. The 15 RHCs plus the IHO Hydrographic Commission on Antarctica effectively cover the world. The IHO, in partnership with the Intergovernmental Oceanographic Commission, directs the General Bathymetric Chart of the Oceans program.

Achievements 
Establishment of the Chart Specifications Committee and International Charts:
 The exploration of the seabed and movements of the sea
 Standardization of maritime measurements, hydrographic terminology, marine cartographic products, and geographical information systems for navigation
 High efficiency of the rapid dissemination of information on safety at sea
 Training of hydrographers and nautical cartographers

Publications 
Most IHO publications, including the standards, guidelines and associated documents such as the International Hydrographic Review, International Hydrographic Bulletin, the Hydrographic Dictionary and the Year Book are available to the general public free of charge from the IHO website. The IHO publishes the international standards related to charting and hydrography, including S-57, IHO Transfer Standard for Digital Hydrographic Data, the encoding standard that is used primarily for electronic navigational charts.

In 2010, the IHO introduced a new, contemporary hydrographic geospatial standard for modelling marine data and information, known as S-100. S-100 and any dependent product specifications are underpinned by an on-line registry accessible via the IHO website. S-100 is aligned with the ISO 19100 series of geographic standards, thereby making it fully compatible with contemporary geospatial data standards.

Because S-100 is based on ISO 19100, it can be used by other data providers for their maritime-related (non-hydrographic) data and information. Various data and information providers from both the government and private sector are now using S-100 as part of the implementation of the e-Navigation concept that has been endorsed by the UN International Maritime Organization (IMO).

Another in the series of publications of interest is S-23, Limits of Oceans and Seas. The 3rd edition dates back to 1953 while the potential 4th edition, started in 1986, has remained a draft since 2002. It was distributed to IHO members, but its official publication has been suspended pending agreement between South Korea and Japan regarding the international standard name of the sea called "Japan Sea" in the 1953 edition.

See also 
 World Hydrography Day

Footnotes

External links 
 

1921 establishments in Monaco
Intergovernmental organizations
International organisations based in Monaco
International standards
Organizations established in 1921
Oceanographic organizations
United Nations General Assembly observers
Hydrography organizations
International geographic data and information organizations